The performance test or "PT" is a section of bar examinations in the United States that is intended to mimic a real-life legal task that future lawyers may face. Of the three parts of most states' bar exams -- MBE, essay, and performance test—the performance test is supposed to be the most reflective of how well a candidate will perform outside of an academic setting.

A performance test may include tasks such as writing a legal memorandum, drafting an affidavit, or drafting a settlement offer letter to opposing counsel.  

One problem with performance tests is that if they actually tested the current law of a state as it relates to a specific subject, bar applicants who attended law school in that state and took a course focused on that state's law on that subject might have an unfair advantage over applicants who did not.  In other words, the performance test would be testing applicants' understanding of current state law, as opposed to their lawyering skills.  To mitigate that advantage, performance tests normally use the law of a fictional state, and its law as provided in the test materials usually has subtle differences from the law in the real world in order to reduce the advantage of having already studied that subject matter in law school.  This forces applicants to demonstrate their ability to interpret and apply the law as they find it, rather than the law they already know.

California Bar Examination performance tests 
Until 1983, the California Bar Examination was only two days long and had no performance test.  During that era, it was criticized as too abstract and failing to test too few skills relevant to the actual practice of law, and was also criticized for disproportionate impact on persons of color.  

In July 1980, the State Bar of California conducted an experiment with 485 bar applicants who volunteered to participate in performance tests in addition to taking the regular bar exam. To give applicants an incentive to participate, the experimental performance tests could only increase but not decrease their chances of passing the bar exam.  The experiment was led by UCLA School of Law professor Paul Bergman and RAND Corporation psychometrician Stephen P. Klein. Based on their results, the State Bar added a three-hour-long performance test to the July 1983 bar exam administration. California performance tests are usually situated in the fictional state of Columbia.

Through February 2017, the California bar exam spanned three days, and included two performance test sections, one the first day (Tuesday) and one the last day (Thursday).  Each PT lasted three hours—for a total of six—and the two PTs were worth 26% of the total score.  The types of tasks presented are:
 Legal memorandum
 Persuasive brief
 Declaration or affidavit
 Closing argument
 Opening statement
 Jury instructions
 Witness cross or direct examination
 Discovery/investigation plan
 Client letter
 Client or witness interview
 Negotiation, settlement proposal or agreement
 Analysis of a contract, will, trust or statute
 Legislation
 Alternative dispute resolution task

Each PT has a file and a library.  The file contains factual materials about the case while the library contains the legal authorities needed. The candidates can either hand write or type using a laptop.

Effective July 2017, the California bar exam was reduced to two days, with a single 90-minute performance test administered on the first afternoon (Tuesday).

Multistate Performance Test

This is a test drafted by the National Conference of Bar Examiners (NCBE), modeled after the California test and intended as a supplement to NCBE's Multistate Essay Examination. NCBE currently offers three different performance tests, each 90 minutes long (as opposed to three hours in California). As of July 2007, 33 jurisdictions use the MPT.  The MPT is usually situated in the fictional state of Franklin.

References

Sources
 California Bar Exam
 National Conference of Bar Examiners Tests (click on link for Multistate Performance Test for more information)

Legal profession exams
Law of the United States